The 2002 Individual Speedway Junior World Championship was the 26th edition of the World motorcycle speedway Under-21 Championships.

The final was won by Lukáš Dryml of the Czech Republic.

World final
September 7, 2002
 Slaný, Slaný Speedway

References

2002
World I J
2002 in the Czech Republic
2002 in Czech sport